This is a list of hospitals in Guatemala, Central America,

Guatemala City

Zone 1 
Cedros de Libano (Cedars of Lebanon) Private hospital.  Address: 8 Avenida 2–48, Zone 1, Ciudad de Guatemala.
Hospital Ángeles  Address: Private hospital.  24-hour emergency department, pediatrics, maternity, and other services. 2a. avenida 14-74 Zona 1, Ciudad de Guatemala.
Hospital Colón  Specialises in treating diabetes.  Address: 8a. calle 11-49 Zona 1, Ciudad de Guatemala.
Hermeroteca Nacional Public hospital. Address: "Lic. Clemente Marroquin Rojas", 5 Av 7–26, Zona 1, Ciudad de Guatemala.
Hospital La Paz  A branch of the central La Paz hospital in Zone 11.  Address: 8a. avenida 2-48, Zona 1, Ciudad de Guatemala.
Hospital de la Polcia Nacional Public hospital. Address: 11 Av 4-49, Zona 1, Ciudad de Guatemala.
Hospital San Pablo (Saint Paul Hospital)  Private hospital founded 1976.  24-hour emergency department.  Address: 8a. calle 1-43 Zona 1, Ciudad de Guatemala.
Hospital Santa Margarita (Saint Margarita Hospital)  24-hour emergency service, gynaecology department.  Address: 11 calle 3-52 Zona 1, Ciudad de Guatemala.
San Juan de Dios (Saint John of God)  Public hospital with emergency centre and 70 other services.  Address: 1a. avenida 10-50 Zona 1, Ciudad de Guatemala.

Zone 2 
Latino Americano Private hospital.  Address: 7 Avenida A 7–50, Zona 2, Ciudad de Guatemala.

Zone 4 
Hospital General de Accidentes 13 Av y Calz, San Juan Zona 4 Mixco, Ciudad de Guatemala.

Zone 10 
Centro de Epilepsia y Neurocirugía Funcional (Center for Epilepsy and Functional Neurosurgery) Specialises in epilepsy. Address: 7a. calle "A" 1-62, Zona 10, Ciudad de Guatemala.
Centro Hospitalario La Paz (La Paz Hospital Centre) Six hospitals throughout Guatemala.  Emergencies, laboratories, outpatients. Address: 3a. calle final 10-70, Zona 10, Ciudad de Guatemala.
Centro Medico (Medical Centre) 24 hour emergency department, intensive care, various laboratories at different branches in Guatemala City. Official site.
Hospital Herrera Llerandi Private hospital.  24 hour emergency department, pediatrics, orthopaedics and traumatology. Address: 6a. avenida 8-71, Zona 10, Ciudad de Guatemala.
Hospital Universitario Esperanza (Esperanza University Hospital) Private hospital.  24 hour emergency department, intensive care unit, maternity, private rooms.  Address: 6a. avenida 7-49, Zona 10, Ciudad de Guatemala.

Zone 11 

Centro Hospitalario La Paz (La Paz Hospital Centre) One of a chain of hospitals in Guatemala.  24 hour emergency department, and specialised departments.  Address: 17 avenida. 28-01, Zona 11, Ciudad de Guatemala.
Hospital Hermano Pedro  Emergency care, intensive care unit, specialised departments.  Address: 17 Avenida, 23-49, Anillo Periférico, Zona 11, Ciudad de Guatemala.
Hospital Roosevelt Public hospital, 24 hour emergency department, and specialised departments.  Address: Calzada Roosevelt 6–58, Zona 11, Ciudad de Guatemala.
Sanatorio Materno Infantil Majadas (Majadas Sanatorium for Children)  Specialises in maternity and related surgery.  Address: 30 avenida A, 3-39 Zona 11 Utatlan II, Ciudad de Guatemala.
UNICAR Specialises in cardiovascular disease, emergency care, surgery.  Address: 5a. avenida 6-22 Zona 11 Ciudad de Guatemala.

Zone 12 
Hospital de Gineco-Obstetrica Public hospital. Address: 14 Av y 4 C, Zona 12 Col Colinas de Pamplona, Planta Telefónica, Ciudad de Guatemala.
Hospital de Rehabilitacion 14 Av y 4 C, Zona 12 Colinas de Pamplona, Ciudad de Guatemala.

Zone 14 
Hospital Bella Aurora Private hospital. Address: 10 Calle 2–31, Zona 14, Ciudad de Guatemala.

Zone 15 
Neustra Senora del Pilar Private hospital. Address: 3 Calle 10–71, Zona 15, Ciudad de Guatemala.

Zone 18 
Hospital de Salud Mental Public hospital. Address: Zona 18 Col Atlántida, Ciudad de Guatemala.

Quetzaltenango 
Hospital Nacional San Juan de Dios Public hospital.

References

Bibliography 
 "Hospitales en la Zona 10 de la Cuidad de Guatemala", guatemala.com, retrieved 26 September 2021.
 McNally, Shelagh, Pocket Adventures Guatemala, Hunter Publishing, 2006 .

External links 
 "Travel Guide Guatemala"§Addresses, Rough Guides – section explaining how to interpret Guatemala addresses.

 List
Hospitals
Guatemala